Sage Northcutt (March 1, 1996) is an American professional mixed martial artist who is currently competing in the Lightweight division of ONE Championship, although he has competed in the Welterweight division as well. He has also previously competed for the Ultimate Fighting Championship (UFC).

Background
Northcutt has been training MMA since the age of 4 and competed all over the world from a young age. His father, Mark, is a black belt in shuri-ryū karate, and his older sister, Colbey, is an amateur kickboxing champion and a professional mixed martial artist currently signed to ONE Championship. At the age of 9, Northcutt became the youngest person ever to be on the cover of Sport Karate Magazine. Northcutt has won a total of 77 world youth championships in karate. He was also an undefeated kickboxer, with his record standing at 15–0.

Northcutt attended Seven Lakes High School for his first two years of high school before transferring to Katy High School during his sophomore year. Northcutt was inducted into the Black Belt Magazine Hall of Fame in 2012 at age 15. In high school Northcutt trained and competed in wrestling, and also trained with Texas A&M university’s NCWA wrestling club before dropping out to pursue his mixed martial arts career.

Mixed martial arts career

Early career
In 2013, Northcutt began competing on the Legacy Fighting Championship amateur mixed martial arts (MMA) series, amassing an amateur record of 5-1 with his only loss coming on his first bout against Charles Sheppard by technical-knockout (TKO) in the first round. At the age of 18, he turned pro and racked up a 5–0 record in 16 months.

Ultimate Fighting Championship
Northcutt was featured in the debut episode of Dana White's Looking For A Fight. After a victory at Legacy Fighting Championship 44, he was signed to the UFC.

In his UFC debut, Northcutt also made his lightweight debut when he faced Francisco Treviño on October 3, 2015, at UFC 192. He won via technical-knockout (TKO) in 57 seconds.

Northcutt's second UFC fight was against Cody Pfister on December 10, 2015, at UFC Fight Night 80. Northcutt won the fight via guillotine choke in the second round.

Northcutt was expected to face Andrew Holbrook on January 30, 2016, at UFC on Fox 18. However, after Holbrook withdrew from the bout citing an injury eight days prior to the event, Northcutt would instead make his welterweight debut against Bryan Barberena. Northcutt lost the bout via submission (arm-triangle choke) in the second round.

Northcutt made a return to lightweight and faced Enrique Marín on July 9, 2016, at UFC 200, where he won via unanimous decision.

Northcutt had his second welterweight bout when he faced Mickey Gall on December 17, 2016, at UFC on Fox 22. He lost the contest via submission in the second round.

Northcutt was expected to face Claudio Puelles in a lightweight bout on July 29, 2017, at UFC 214. However, Puelles pulled out of the fight in mid-June citing injury and was replaced by John Makdessi. In turn, the fight was canceled on July 14 due to injuries to both fighters.

Northcutt faced Michel Quiñones on November 11, 2017, at UFC Fight Night 120. He won the fight via unanimous decision.

Northcutt faced Thibault Gouti on February 18, 2018, at UFC Fight Night 126. He won the fight via unanimous decision.

Northcutt faced Zak Ottow on July 14, 2018, at UFC Fight Night 133. He won the fight via knockout in the second round. Appearing on The Ariel Helwani Show early September 2018, Northcutt confirmed his contract expired following the fight with Ottow, making him a free agent. In the same appearance, Northcutt said he planned to listen for offers from various promotions.

On November 26, 2018, Dana White confirmed on UFC Unfiltered that the UFC did not opt to renew Sage Northcutt's contract. White cited reasons, claiming, "Sage is young, and Sage needs some work. Let him get some work in some other organizations, and we will see where this kid ends up in a couple of years. Maybe we will pick him back up again."

ONE Championship
On November 30, 2018, it was announced that Northcutt had signed with ONE Championship. On February 26, 2019, it was announced that Northcutt was scheduled to make his promotional debut against Cosmo Alexandre on May 17, 2019, in ONE Championship: Enter the Dragon. Northcutt lost the fight by knockout 29 seconds into the first round, marking his first professional loss by knockout. The blow resulted in eight facial fractures which required prompt surgical repair.

On November 22, 2019, Northcutt announced that he would be moving down two weight classes to compete at featherweight (155 lbs) in ONE Championship. “I learned my lesson about fighting a weight class too big, going back down to 155, and it’ll be better for me,” Northcutt said in an interview with MMA News.

Northcutt was scheduled to fight Shinya Aoki in a Lightweight bout, after a near two-year layoff, at ONE on TNT 4, on April 28, 2021. However, Northcutt withdrew from the bout due to lingering COVID-19 effects and was replaced by Eduard Folayang.

Almost four years after his loss to Alexandre, Northcutt is scheduled to face Ahmed Mujtaba on May 5, 2023, at ONE Fight Night 10.

Personal life
Northcutt was majoring in petroleum engineering at Texas A&M University. In January 2017, Northcutt announced he would withdraw from  Texas A&M University to train mixed martial arts full-time. Northcutt is a Christian. Northcutt married actress Amanda Leighton on December 5, 2020.

Mixed martial arts record

|-
| Loss
|align=center| 11–3
|Cosmo Alexandre
|KO  (punch)
|ONE Championship: Enter the Dragon
|
|align=center|1
|align=center|0:29
|Kallang, Singapore
| 
|-
|Win
|align=center| 11–2
|Zak Ottow
|KO  (punches)
|UFC Fight Night: dos Santos vs. Ivanov 
|
|align=center|2
|align=center|3:13
|Boise, Idaho, United States
|
|-
|Win
|align=center|10–2
|Thibault Gouti
|Decision (unanimous)
|UFC Fight Night: Cowboy vs. Medeiros 
|
|align=center|3
|align=center|5:00
|Austin, Texas, United States
|
|-
|Win
|align=center|9–2
|Michel Quiñones
|Decision (unanimous)
|UFC Fight Night: Poirier vs. Pettis
|
|align=center|3
|align=center|5:00
|Norfolk, Virginia, United States
|
|-
| Loss
|align=center|8–2
|Mickey Gall
|Submission (rear-naked choke)
|UFC on Fox: VanZant vs. Waterson
|
|align=center|2
|align=center|1:40
|Sacramento, California, United States
|
|-
|Win
|align=center|8–1
|Enrique Marín
|Decision (unanimous)
|UFC 200
|
|align=center|3
|align=center|5:00
|Las Vegas, Nevada, United States
|
|-
|Loss
|align=center|7–1
|Bryan Barberena 
|Submission (arm-triangle choke)
|UFC on Fox: Johnson vs. Bader
|
|align=center|2
|align=center|3:06
|Newark, New Jersey, United States
|
|-
|Win
|align=center|7–0
|Cody Pfister
|Submission (guillotine choke)
|UFC Fight Night: Namajunas vs. VanZant
|
|align=center|2
|align=center|0:41
|Las Vegas, Nevada, United States
|
|-
|Win
| align=center|6–0
| Francisco Treviño
| TKO (elbows and punches)
| UFC 192
| 
| align=center|1
| align=center|0:57
| Houston, Texas, United States
|
|-
| Win
| align=center|5–0
| Rocky Long
| Submission (neck crank)
| Legacy FC 44
| 
| align=center|2
| align=center|3:30
| Houston, Texas, United States
|
|-
| Win
| align=center|4–0
| Gage Duhon
| Submission (rear-naked choke)
| Legacy FC 42
| 
| align=center| 1
| align=center| 4:26
| Lake Charles, Louisiana, United States
|
|-
| Win
| align=center|3–0
| James Christopherson
| TKO (punches)
| Fury Fighting 6
| 
| align=center| 1
| align=center| 4:35
| Humble, Texas, United States
|
|-
| Win
| align=center|2–0
| Jacob Capelli
| TKO (punches)
| Legacy FC: Challenger Series 1
| 
| align=center| 1
| align=center| 0:55
| Houston, Texas, United States
|
|-
| Win
| align=center|1–0
| Tim Lashley
| TKO (wheel kick and punches)
| Legacy FC 37
| 
| align=center| 1
| align=center| 0:27
| Houston, Texas, United States
|

See also

 List of current ONE fighters
 List of male mixed martial artists

Notes

References

External links
 
 

1996 births
Living people
American male mixed martial artists
Mixed martial artists from Texas
Mixed martial artists utilizing Shuri-ryū
Mixed martial artists utilizing kajukenbo
Mixed martial artists utilizing taekwondo
Mixed martial artists utilizing Brazilian jiu-jitsu
Lightweight mixed martial artists
Place of birth missing (living people)
American male taekwondo practitioners
People from Katy, Texas
American kajukenbo practitioners
American male karateka
American practitioners of Brazilian jiu-jitsu
Texas A&M University alumni
American male kickboxers
Kickboxers from Texas
American Christians
Ultimate Fighting Championship male fighters